Lusitano Stadium, located in Ludlow, Massachusetts, is a 3,000-seat stadium built in 1918 currently used for soccer. Currently its tenants are the Western Mass Pioneers of the USL League Two, the New England Mutiny of United Women's Soccer and the Western United Pioneers premier youth club

Between 2003 and 2005, New England Revolution played three games on the stadium.

Previous tenants
 Ludlow Lusitano (ASL) (1955–1958)
 Western Mass Lady Pioneers (W-League) (2004–2009)

External links
 Lusitano Stadium Home

References 

Soccer venues in Massachusetts
Western Mass Pioneers
Sports venues in Hampden County, Massachusetts
Ludlow, Massachusetts
1918 establishments in Massachusetts
Sports venues completed in 1918